Prairie Township is an inactive township in Randolph County, in the U.S. state of Missouri.

Prairie Township was so named on account of a prairie within its borders.

References

Townships in Missouri
Townships in Randolph County, Missouri